A Letter to Myself is the fifth studio album by American soul group The Chi-Lites, produced and largely written by lead singer Eugene Record.  The album was released in 1973 on the Brunswick label.

History
The first single released from the album was "We Need Order" and the song peaked at #13 on the R&B chart and #61 on Billboard Hot 100.  The title track was released as the second single and peaked at #3 on the R&B chart and #33 on the Billboard Hot 100.  The album was the third of four consecutive Chi-Lites albums to make the R&B top 5 (reaching #4), but has only a moderate critical reputation, with none of the tracks being considered as strong as the highlights on (For God's Sake) Give More Power to the People or A Lonely Man.

Track listing

Personnel
Eugene Record, Marshall Thompson, Robert "Squirrel" Lester, Creadel "Red" Jones – vocals
Thomas (Tom Tom) Washington – piano
Arthur Hoyle, Raymond Orr, Murray Watson – trumpets
Murray Watson, Raymond Orr – flugelhorn
Cliff Davis – baritone saxophone, flute, tenor saxophone, alto saxophone
Gene Barge – alto saxophone
Frank Robinson – tenor saxophone, flute
William A. Adkins – tenor saxophone, piccolo
Morris Ellis – trombone, bass trombone
Ethel Merker, Julia M. Studebaker – French horn
Bobby Christian, Floyd Morris – marimba, tympani, orchestra bells
Floyd Morris – cello
Sol Bobrov, Elliot Golab, Edward Green, Gerasim Warutian, Frank Borgognone, Roger Moulton, Johnny Frigo – violins
Carl Fruh, Roger Malitz, Emil Mittermann – viola
Eugene Record – electric bass, organ, electric guitar
William Robinson – electric bass
Rufus Reid – upright bass
Cy Touff – harmonica
Danny Reid – electric guitar
Ron Steele – acoustic guitar
Quinton Joseph – drums

Production
Eugene Record – producer  
Thomas (Tom Tom) Washington – arranger, conductor, associate producer
Bruce Swedien – audio engineer, associate producer
Quinton Joseph – associate producer, director
Willie Henderson – director
William Sanders – arranger

Charts

Singles

References

External links
A Letter to Myself at Discogs

1973 albums
The Chi-Lites albums
Brunswick Records albums
Albums produced by Eugene Record